Granulibacter bethesdensis is a Gram-negative, aerobic coccobacillus to rod-shaped, non-motile, catalase-positive and oxidase-negative bacteria first described in 2006 by Dr. Steve  Holland's team at the National Institutes of Health in Bethesda, Maryland.

Clinical Significance 

Granulibacter bethesdensis was identified in a series of patients with chronic granulomatous disease (CGD). In a later study, nearly half of patients with CGD tested and a quarter of healthy volunteers showed some immunoreactivity to Granulibacter bethesdensis, suggesting infections with this organism occur more often than it is isolated.

References

External links 
 LPSN

Type strain of Granulibacter bethesdensis at BacDive -  the Bacterial Diversity Metadatabase

Rhodospirillales
Bacteria described in 2006